The Journal of Animal Science is a peer-reviewed scientific journal in the field of animal science. It is published by the American Society of Animal Science.

External links 
 

Monthly journals
Publications established in 1910
English-language journals
Animal science journals
Academic journals associated with learned and professional societies of the United States